Cormac MacCarthy Mor (1271–1359) was a King of Desmond.

Birth and origins 
Cormac was born in 1271, probably the third son of Donal Og MacCarthy who died in 1306.

Children 
MacCarthy had at least three sons. Two of them are quite well known:
Donal Og MacCarthy Mor (Domhnall Óg Mac Carthaigh Mór) (died 1391), his successor
Dermot MacCarthy (Diarmaid Mac Carthaigh) (1340–1381), the first Lord of Muskerry

Notes, citations, and sources

Notes

Citations

Sources 
 
 
  – Irish stem

1271 births
1359 deaths
MacCarthy dynasty
Irish kings